Adriana Moraes Rêgo Reis (born 29 July 1969) is a Brazilian actress.

Professional life 

Drica Moraes started doing theater in Andrews College, Zona Sul of Rio de Janeiro with Miguel Falabella. She also studied in Tablado, at the age of 13, and started her first experiences as an actress in theater for children, in Labours of Hercules, adaptation of the book by Monteiro Lobato in 1983. She also took part of the plays Our Town, 1984, and Little Red Riding Hood, written and directed by Maria Clara Machado, in 1985.

Moraes debuted professionally with the show The Secret of Cocachim, as Denise Crispum, in 1989, which earned her the Coca-Cola Award. In television, her first appearance could not have been more discreet. Her debut work took place in Rede Globo in 1986, in the episode O Sequestro de Lauro Corona, in the extinct Teletema, written by Ricardo Linhares. Although she was small, the role played by the actress drew the attention of director Roberto Talma, responsible for the show, which invited her to his first telenovela, Top Model, three years later, where she played the maid Cida.

While working for the author Walcyr Carrasco, she played Machiavellian villains and comic girls. In 1996, she made a special appearance in the drama of Rede Manchete, whereas joining the cast of the novel Xica da Silva, as the terrible and evil Violante, which earned her the APCA award for Best Actress of the year. Four years later, in Rede Globo, she portrayed the selfish Marcela in the telenovela O Cravo e a Rosa. In 2002, she was part of the telenovela Desejos de Mulher. She was also the co-star character as the manicure Márcia in Chocolate com Pimenta. She had also portrayed Olívia in Alma Gêmea.

Prior to becoming an actress, Drica considered to be a designer and participated in the making of a poetry book, creating visual images to illustrate the work. In July 2010, she debuted on the national movie circuit in O Bem Amado, in which she was one of Sisters Cajazeiras. Months later, in January 2011, the film was aired by Rede Globo as a series divided into four chapters.

In 2010, the actress had acute myeloid leukemia and underwent a bone marrow treatment. She acted in Ti Ti Ti as the physical therapist Teresa Batalha, in a cameo role character in the last chapters of the plot. In the same year she had a special appearance in an episode of A Grande Família.

In 2012, she was in the miniseries Dercy de Verdade, playing Clô Prado. In the same year, she returned into telenovelas in the remake of Guerra dos Sexos.

In 2014, enters the cast of Doce de Mãe, playing Rosalinda. Still in 2014, Moraes, played the great villain Cora, in Império, being praised for its interpretation. The actress had to leave the soap opera for health problems, being replaced by Marjorie Estiano, who played the same character in the first phase of the plot. In 2015, was confirmed like protagonist of Verdades Secretas, novel of the 23h, written by Walcyr Carrasco, replacing Deborah Secco.

In 2016, she was in the Justice miniseries, where she played Vânia Ferraz, an unbalanced and emotionally fragile woman, acting with Antônio Calloni and Cauã Reymond. Drica was praised by web surfers.b In 2017 is escalated like protagonist next to Fábio Assunção of the miniseries A Fórmula. The miniseries had negative repercussion, and low hearing, being discarded a second season.

Personal life 
In 1994, when recording a show on TV, Drica met director Régis Faria. In the same year they married. In 1998 Drica discovered to be pregnant, for her happiness, but in a few months suffered a miscarriage, getting severely depressed and not wanting to get pregnant again. In 2003, the couple was not getting along, and decided to divorce.

In 2003 Drica met and married the cultural producer Raul Schmidt. In 2009 Drica became a mother, which was her greatest dream: Why not want to get pregnant again for fear of having another miscarriage, she adopt a baby 1 month old, whom she named Mateus. She says she does not want the child to hide the fact that he intends to foster and adopt another baby after Mateus is greater. In 2008, for marital disagreements, Drica and Raul divorced. In early 2009 began a new relationship with the homeopathic physician Fernando Pitanga.

Health 
In February 2010, after doing many tests, and over one year feeling very bad, with fainting and body aches, Moraes was admitted to the Samaritan Hospital to see what had, until there was a diagnosis of acute myeloid leukemia. Drica began to start chemotherapy. His friends and relatives mobilized a major campaign for blood donation. In July 2010, underwent a bone marrow transplant. Once retrieved, Drica gave an interview on Fantástico. During the interview, she said, "Your life will improve a lot if you do not die." She will make intensive care for another year and will be followed for life, to prevent the disease returning.

In 2014, Drica was removed from the Império novel for a week. She was diagnosed with pharyngitis and was later permanently removed from the Império, where her character is one of the most prominent in the plot, for being a villain. At the time, it was considered among the public that the cancer would have returned, which was denied by the own actress and team of the novel. Pharyngitis, caused by the fragility of her health and being overworked, hurt her voice and made her hoarse, and she could not act in those conditions. According to the author of the novel, Aguinaldo Silva, reveals that he had to catch light with Drica Moraes since the beginning of the novel of the nine of the Globo, in July. The actress maintains special health care because of a cancer she faced in 2010. "Every time I wrote a strong scene I could not help but think that I was doing an enormous harm to Drica's health." Then Aguinaldo Silva again called Marjorie Estiano to replace Drica Moraes, the actress had played the younger Cora in the first phase.

Filmography

Television

Films

Theater

Awards and nominations

Grande Otelo

APCA Awards

Art Quality Brazil Awards

Best of the Year – Globe Awards

Cartagena Film Festival

Contigo! Awards

Guarani Cinema Awards

Mambembe Awards

Quem Awards

Shell Awards

References

External links 

1969 births
Living people
Actresses from Rio de Janeiro (city)
Brazilian television actresses
Brazilian telenovela actresses
Brazilian film actresses
Brazilian stage actresses